Francis Arthur Perkins (20 February 1889 – 15 October 1967) was a British engineer, businessman, creator of the Perkins Diesel Engine, and founder of Perkins Engines.

Background and early life
Perkins was born in Peterborough, the son of John Edward Sharman Perkins, a manufacturer of agricultural machinery, and his wife Margaret Charlotte Long. His brother Christopher Perkins became a noted artist, and both boys were educated at Gresham's School, Holt, Norfolk. Frank attended Rugby School (1902–1904), Gresham's (1904–1907), and Emmanuel College, Cambridge, (1907–1910) gaining a pass degree in mechanical engineering in 1910.

War service
At the beginning of the First World War, Perkins volunteered for the army and, in October 1914, was commissioned in the Royal Engineers. He served in its 34th divisional company in the Dardanelles, Palestine, and Egypt. He was demobilised in 1918 with the rank of major.

Career
He was a third generation engineer, following both his grandfather and father, who both worked for Barford & Perkins, a family firm that manufactured road construction rollers/compactors, agricultural rollers, and other agricultural machinery. However, before joining the family firm at its Queen Street ironworks in Peterborough, he worked for Lawes Chemicals Ltd.

While later working at Aveling & Porter in Rochester, Kent, Perkins started working on a high-speed, light-weight, diesel engine with Charles Chapman. Before they could complete the project, Aveling & Porter went bankrupt. Convinced that the scheme would be profitable in serving the agricultural tractor market, the two formed their own company, F. Perkins Limited, on 7 June 1932, initially with four employees and based in a rented workshop. Chapman was the technical director and Perkins the chairman.

Perkins would go on building new engines and building the company until 1959, when at the age of seventy he sold a majority stake to his largest customer, Massey Ferguson. He was president of the Society of Motor Manufacturers and Traders (1956–57) and Sheriff of Cambridgeshire and Huntingdonshire (1956–57). He died at his home, Alwalton Hall, near Peterborough, in 1967. There is a plaque to his memory in Alwalton parish church where Henry Royce (1863–1933), co-founder of  Rolls-Royce, is also commemorated. A section of the A1139 through Peterborough is named Frank Perkins Parkway.

Family
In 1915, while on leave from the Royal Engineers, Perkins married Susan Gwynneth Gee, the daughter of Hugh Roberts Williams. They had one son and three daughters.

Sources and further reading

See also
Perkins Engines
List of Perkins engines

References
Perkins, Francis Arthur [Frank] (1889–1967), diesel engine manufacturer by Anne Pimlott Baker in Oxford Dictionary of National Biography

External links
Perkins Engines Company
 History of Perkins Engines

1889 births
1967 deaths
People educated at Gresham's School
Alumni of Emmanuel College, Cambridge
British automotive engineers
People from Peterborough
British automotive pioneers
Perkins engines
Royal Engineers officers
British Army personnel of World War I